Ferris & Sylvester are a British folk duo from London. The group is made of Issy Ferris and Archie Sylvester.

History
The duo released their debut EP in 2017 titled The Yellow Line. They released their second album in 2018, titled Made in Streatham. The duo released their third EP in 2019 titled I Should Be on a Train. On 11 March 2022, Ferris & Sylvester released their debut full-length album Superhuman.

References

Musical groups from London
Folk music duos